Carrie Owen is a fictional character from the British Channel 4 soap opera Hollyoaks, played by Jaq Croft.

Development

Personality and identity
Warm and caring, Carrie feels deeply for her children and will go to great lengths to protect them even though her interfering can earn her little gratitude at times. Carrie is intelligent and will usually act as though she is naive or unaware of what is going on in her children's lives, whilst she is really picking up more than she lets on. She only becomes involved when she feels it is absolutely necessary and tends to let her views go unnoticed much of the time.

Storylines
Carrie arrived in Hollyoaks with her children Sam, Russ and Nicole and had a whole mystery to her family. Eventually, it was revealed that Carrie and her family had to move homes because of Sam having been in prison for three years due to setting a house on fire, a crime that he never committed. Later on, Carrie’s husband, Rob, arrived in the village and wanted to make up with his family after they had a fall out over Sam’s innocence. Carrie decided to allow Rob to move back in with the family and slowly Carrie and Rob got back together.

Although Carrie may seem over protected over her children, she always had their best interests but sometimes it worked against her. Russ had testicular cancer and wanted to cope with the situation by himself, however after eventually he confessed to his mother, she supported Russ through his ordeal. However, Carrie and family’s world was to turn upside down when Sam confessed that he has been spiking and raping girls. With little choice, Carrie and her family forced Sam to turn himself to the police and as he finally did, it was too devastating for Carrie. Sam was sentenced for 25 years, which left Carrie heartbroken and even further more when Sam told her that he no longer wanted prison visits.

Six months down the line, Sam escaped from prison and this time the effects were to be horrendous. He burnt down the local pub The Dog in The Pond which left several people dead (including Sam himself). Carrie throw herself into the household chores and organised Sam's funeral. Both Nicole and Russ refused to go to the funeral with Russ deciding to intend his girlfriend Sophie Burton and her sister Mel Burton’s funeral who both had also died in The Dog in The Pond fire and Carrie was left shattered by this. With Nicole being bullied and the Owen family receiving abuse from the minority residents of Hollyoaks, Carrie decided it was the best for her and her family to move away from Hollyoaks. Carrie, Rob and Nicole left the village behind except Russ as he wanted to stay with girlfriend Mercedes McQueen. Nicole returned to give evidence at Becca's trial and for Russ's wedding but neither Carrie or Rob have ever returned to Hollyoaks.

In 2018, Mercedes went to stay with Rob and Carrie for a while before going to Spain after giving her son Bobby to Cleo to hide him from Carl. She later mentioned that the couple move on from their past and forgive her for her affair with Warren and accept her to relationship with Russ once again.

References

External links
 Character profile at Hollyoaks.com

Hollyoaks characters
Television characters introduced in 2004
Female characters in television